Armstead Parker (c.1699–1777) of Burghberry Manor, Peterborough, Northamptonshire  was a British Tory politician who sat in the House of Commons  between 1734 and 1768.

Parker was the only son of Charles Parker MP for Peterborough, and his wife  Katherine Wilson. In 1730 his father died and he succeeded to Burghberry and the electoral interest. He married Elizabeth Rogers, daughter of Francis Rogers, keeper of the wardrobe to James II, on 28 January1738.

Parker was returned as Tory Member of Parliament for Peterborough at a by-election on  29 January 1734  on his family interest, and followed it up with successful return in a contest at the 1734 British general election. He voted against the Government. He did not stand at the 1741 British general election but was returned unopposed in succession to William FitzWilliam, 3rd Earl FitzWilliam at a by-election on 3 May 1742. He continued to vote against the Government until 1746, when he supported them on the Hanoverians  He did not stand in 1747.

Parker was next returned unopposed for Peterborough at the 1761 British general election  on his family interest.  He appears to have supported both the Bute and Grenville Administrations. Lord Sandwich described him to Grenville  as a very independent man  and advised he should not be  neglected. Parker voted with the Opposition against the repeal of the Stamp Act on 22 February 1766. No other vote by him is recorded, and there is no evidence of his having spoken in Parliament. Before the 1768 British general election he decided not to stand in favour of his son who then withdrew before the poll in return for £1000.

Parker died on 5 February 1777 leaving a son and two daughters.

References

1690s births
1777 deaths
Members of the Parliament of Great Britain for English constituencies
British MPs 1727–1734
British MPs 1734–1741
British MPs 1741–1747
British MPs 1761–1768